Meike Wortel (born 23 November 1982, Delft) is a Dutch bridge player. At the annual World Bridge Federation (WBF) meet in October 2014, she won one teams gold medal and one pairs silver medal. Thus she became a World Women Grand Master.

In the European Bridge League championships she played on three Dutch teams that won gold medals, the 2005 under-26 Women (Girls), the 2007 under-26 (Juniors), and the 2007 Women.

In world championship  competition, Wortel was a member of the 6-woman team that won the quadrennial McConnell Cup (women teams) at Sanya, China in October 2014. She played with Marion Michielsen. At the same meet, she and Jacek Pszczoła finished second in the World Mixed Pairs Championship.

Bridge accomplishments

Wins
 European Bridge Championships (Women, 2014)
 North American Bridge Championships (2)
 Machlin Women's Swiss Teams (1) 2013 
 Sternberg Women's Board-a-Match Teams (1) 2012

Runners-up

 North American Bridge Championships (4)
 Nail Life Master Open Pairs (1) 2012 
 Wagar Women's Knockout Teams (2) 2008, 2013 
 Sternberg Women's Board-a-Match Teams (1) 2011

Personal life
Wortel currently resides in Oslo, Norway, where she works as a biology researcher at the University of Oslo. She is a mother of one child.

Notes

References

External links
  (mathematics)
 Wortel at Systems Bioinformatics
 
 
 Bridge Kids: Meike Wortel talks about junior bridge audio-video conversation at YouTube (6 August 2010)
 FIDE profile (chess)

1982 births
Dutch contract bridge players
Living people
Sportspeople from Delft